Hooper is a city in Weber County, Utah, United States, first called Muskrat Springs and later Hooperville for Captain William Henry Hooper, an early Utah delegate to Congress. The population was 9,087 at the 2020 census, up from the 2010 figure of 6,932. Prior to the city's incorporation on November 30, 2000, Hooper was an unincorporated census-designated place (CDP).

Hooper is part of the Ogden–Clearfield, Utah Metropolitan Statistical Area. The current mayor is Dale R. Fowers.

History
Hooper was settled in 1854, and become a township in 1997 (about 15 years after a failed vote to incorporate).  Over the next several years "it became evident that the township board could make plans and suggestions, but had no official power," so a vote to incorporate passed on May 2, 2000, with the city being officially incorporated on November 30, 2000.

Geography
According to the United States Census Bureau, the CDP has a total area of 11.7 square miles (30.3 km2), of which 11.5 square miles (29.9 km2) is land and 0.2 square mile (0.4 km2) (1.45%) is water.

Fremont Island in the Great Salt Lake is included in this city's boundary. On March 30, 2007, Glenn Barrow became the first Hooper mayor to visit the island in the city's brief history.

Demographics

As of the census of 2000, there were 3,926 people, 1,150 households, and 1,013 families residing in the CDP. The population density was 340.2 people per square mile (131.4/km2). There were 1,177 housing units at an average density of 102.0 per square mile (39.4/km2). The racial makeup of the CDP was 97.71% White, 0.15% African American, 0.28% Native American, 0.51% Asian, 0.10% Pacific Islander, 0.64% from other races, and 0.61% from two or more races. Hispanic or Latino of any race were 2.06% of the population.

There were 1,150 households, out of which 46.7% had children under the age of 18 living with them, 80.2% were married couples living together, 4.7% had a female householder with no husband present, and 11.9% were non-families. 10.3% of all households were made up of individuals, and 4.2% had someone living alone who was 65 years of age or older. The average household size was 3.41 and the average family size was 3.68.

In the CDP, the population was spread out, with 33.3% under the age of 18, 10.4% from 18 to 24, 25.3% from 25 to 44, 23.1% from 45 to 64, and 7.8% who were 65 years of age or older. The median age was 31 years. For every 100 females, there were 104.2 males. For every 100 females age 18 and over, there were 106.9 males.

The median income for a household in the CDP was $62,043, and the median income for a family was $65,682. Males had a median income of $40,633 versus $29,138 for females. The per capita income for the CDP was $20,245. About 0.6% of families and 0.9% of the population were below the poverty line, including 1.6% of those under age 18 and 1.5% of those age 65 or over.

Government
The mayor of Hooper is Dale R. Fowers.

Hooper also has a city council that consists of five members representing six districts. Three members represent two districts each and the other two members are at large representatives.

Federal Representation 
Hooper is located in Utah's First Congressional District
For the 116th United States Congress, Utah's First Congressional District is represented by Blake Moore (R)

See also

 List of cities and towns in Utah

References

External links

 

Former census-designated places in Utah
Cities in Utah
Cities in Weber County, Utah
Ogden–Clearfield metropolitan area
Populated places established in 2000